La técnica cubana, often abbreviated as técnica, is a form of Cuban contemporary dance that was founded by Ramiro Guerra Suarez in Cuba in 1959. Unlike other forms of traditional Cuban dance, técnica fuses many different dance forms together, such as those from Africa, Europe, and North America. It is a highly expressive and robust dance form, incorporating many quick jumps and undulating movements of the torso and pelvis. Técnica blends a high amount of movement and expression with a degree of synchronization, producing an athletic, theatrical dance form.

Técnica was founded directly following the 1959 Cuban Revolution. The Revolution was driven by ideas of socialism and a lack of Cuban nationalism, which brought about major change to the political, economical, and social realms of Cuba. The new Castro regime provided funding and government support to expand the arts, and thus técnica, a new revolutionary Cuban dance form was established. The similar timing of técnica’s birth allowed the dance form to incorporate many revolutionary ideas—boosting Cuban nationalism and providing a sense of national and personal identity for Cubans. Técnica incorporated this nationalist vision into its dance technique and created a sense of cubanidad, or “Cuban-ness.”

History

Origins 

La técnica cubana was founded in Cuba in 1959 and is intimately linked to revolutionary ideals and social activism. The Cuban Revolution of 1959, led by Fidel Castro, transformed the Cuban economy and enacted a series of progressive social reforms in which wealth was redistributed, health care services became free of charge, and racial boundaries were diminished. Cuban nationalism was on the rise for the first time since before Spanish control. The revolutionary government employed culture as a way to unite the Cuban population and promote nationalism. In keeping with this effort to promote Cuban culture, Castro's new regime fostered expansion of the arts by encouraged the creation of new art forms. Castro's government appointed Ramiro Guerra, an accomplished dancer and choreographer, as the director of the Department of Modern Dance, housed within the Teatro Nacional (English: National Theatre) in the Plaza de la Revolución in Cuba.

The goal of the department was to create a dance group with original repertory that was rooted in an original Cuban contemporary dance style. Guerra and his colleagues thus founded a contemporary dance group, Conjunto Nacional de Danza Moderna (English: The National Modern Dance Ensemble) with support from the new Castro regime. This group gave técnica a mandate and a place to grow and develop. Although the group had the benefit of Guerra's leadership, it was created with influences from a group of people, including Martha Graham, José Limón, among others. This distinguishes técnica from other modern dance groups, as most other groups originated and were associated with a specific individual. In this way, técnica naturally reflected the wide range of Cuban movement intelligence, rather than the sole artistic genius of one person. Conjunto Nacional de Danza Moderna was officially established in 1959 and held its first show in 1960 at the Teatro Nacional in Havana. The financial support of the revolutionary government contributed to great initial success, as the dancers and creators of técnica did not have to rely on outside jobs for income, finance rehearsal space, or commission compositions. Técnica was created with the social backing of the new regime and aimed to link the power of dance with Cuban national image. As a result, técnica was a key component of the intellectual socialist production of the new revolutionary Cuba in 1959. Guerra incorporated nationalist ideals of inclusion into his work by combining academic dance elements with popular traditions on the streets, which he then raised to a national level. This new dance language not only reflected Cuban history and experience, but also provided space to accommodate the rapidly changing culture. Guerra had the dream to bring together groups of dancers from different cultural backgrounds to contribute to the Cuban ajiaco, or stew. His dance company consisted of 12 white and 12 black dancers from both amateur and professional backgrounds of Afro-Cuban dance, nightclub dance, and ballet. La técnica cubana constantly transcended the boundaries of dance with respect to behavior, culture, and aesthetic. The group that Guerra founded and led for eleven years is presently known as Danza Contemporanea de Cuba and is now led by Miguel A. Iglesias Ferrer.

National Identity 
One of the critical aspects of the founding of la técnica cubana was to strengthen national identity and heighten the pride of cubanidad, or ‘Cuban-ness.’ This idea of national identity had its roots in the Cuban Revolution, where one of the major goals was to establish a sense of Cuban nationalism not embraced since the rule by Spain and the United States. The revolutionary regime reinvigorated Cuba's strong dance heritage in order to provide a unifying factor for the Cuban people. Thus, la técnica cubana was founded to reflect Cuba's legendary dance heritage and its diverse population, while regaining a symbol of national identity.

State support for dance in Cuba not only created a new technique and style, but also a sense of identity and value for Cuban dancers; contemporary dance was part of a movement toward Cuban creativity and individuality. The artistic expression of técnica resonated with the Cuban audience. Ramiro Guerra, known as the founder of técnica, created his choreography “in search of a certain cubanía in his style of dance.” La técnica cubana played a crucial role in revitalizing Cuba's vibrant dance community and was a key contributor to the expanding Cuban national sentiment. The national sentiment of Cuba today is still influenced by the original creation of técnica and its continued growth throughout the years.

Plurality of Influences 

La técnica cubana is a hybrid of Afro-Cuban dance traditions, European ballet, rumba, flamenco, Cuban nightclub cabaret, and North American dance. The goal in creating técnica was to establish a distinctly Cuban modern dance form that represented Cuba's multicultural population.

The major African dance traditions currently in Cuba are derived from four major African groups: Carabali, Kongo-Angolan, Arará, and Yoruba. African heritage is characterized by dance rituals and orisha worship. Each orisha, or spirit, has his or her own gestures, footwork and rhythms that correspond to Yoruba legends and beliefs. Distinctive features of Afro-Cuban dance traditions, such as movements of the arms and head and presence of vibrant music, are incorporated within la técnica cubana. Técnica celebrates the vibrant African heritage and fuses aspects of their dance technique into técnica’s style.

European ballet techniques are also highly prevalent in técnica. European ballet is characterized by big turns, multiple jumps and precise balance. Técnica dancers are well known for their high jumps and completion of multiple turns across stage, as so are their balletic counterparts. Ballet also boasts a strong lower body foundation, which is coupled with the African-tradition use of the arms and fused into técnica’s technique. European ballet style is also a key component of the training of técnica dancers. Ballet, with its international fame, contributes to the style of técnica alongside Afro-Cuban dance traditions.

Técnica also included aspects of rumba, a traditionally Cuban dance that arose as a secular genre of Cuban music. The stylistic techniques of the elongated torso and flexed posture in rumba are present in the stance of técnica dancers: knees are bent and the body is tilted forward from the hips. Técnica combines the rhythms, chants and posture of rumba and incorporates them into the multifaceted style of la técnica cubana.

Influences from the Spanish-based Flamenco dance can also be seen in técnica. The vibrant use of the arms and hands in the dance technique of técnica is derived from floreo, flourishes of the hand, and port de bras, arm movement, in Flamenco dance.

The dance elements and techniques from these strong dance forms are all reflected or subtly referenced in técnica. La técnica cubana merges a unique blend of indigenous and external dance forms to create a new modern form that is the heartbeat of Cuban dance. It is a hybrid dance form, intertwining many of the dance legacies in Cuba, all while still grounded in the modern, social context of Cuba. Técnica was created intentionally to reflect the diversity of Cuban culture and to include a plurality of dance influences.

Dance Technique 
The dance technique of la técnica cubana is athletic and powerful, reflective of the multitude of dance influences from Africa, Europe, North America, and Cuba. Técnica dancers are known to jump higher, undulate faster, and complete more turns than their dancer counterparts. Técnica is demanding and dynamic, producing dancers that move with remarkable ease.

A class in la técnica cubana begins with a warm up on the center floor and barre exercises. The dancers alternate between parallel, first position, and second position. The warm up includes stretching of the upper body and hamstrings by extending the torso and arms in various directions. Guerra credits Afro-Cuban folkloric dance for the torso and pelvis movements prevalent in técnica. He states, “The use of the pelvis is highly developed in our dances. Its instinctive for us. And all of the upper torso work is not only like this, but also in torsion.” After the torso and pelvis movements, hip rolls, relevés, drops to plié and neck twists usually follow the warm up, starting on one side and repeating on the other.

Although the warm up includes many techniques derived from European ballet, such as relevés, pliés, tendus, and arabesques, the sequences themselves are composed of unparalleled elements. Dancers execute big jumps while traveling across the floor, incorporating turns and extensions. They balance on the balls of their feet, drop their bodies to the floor and leap up in a large split. One main characteristic of técnica is the large jumps, which range from barrel turns to tours en I’air to standard leaps.

The final portion of the class includes a cool down that incorporates the rhythms of several orisha images. The gentle walks are combined with undulating the spine and shaking the rib cage.

Improvisation also plays a large role in the choreographing of técnica. Guerra explains, “improvisation comes from popular dances, and from African tradition. We are very conscious of rhythm; we can do one rhythm with our hands and another with our feet, and this comes in part from flamenco.”

One hallmark of a técnica class is the use of a musical ensemble. A mixture of guitarists, drummers, singers, and flute players accompany every class, playing a variety of music types ranging from orisha songs, Afro-Cuban folklore, and country tunes. If the musicians play a familiar folk melody, the dancers join in singing all together. The presence of live music transforms the dance studio and affects the rhythm and kinetics of the dance techniques. After observing a técnica class at the National School of Dance, Suki John reflects, “the variations in dynamic and speed by the rhythmic complexity of the music affect the feeling of the movement profoundly.” The incorporation of live music is unique to técnica and links the dance technique to its Cuban heritage.

The dance technique of la técnica cubana is unique and expressive, and it encompasses a variety of other dance styles. Técnica is ever changing and the technique continues to evolve on stage where dancers and choreographers alike speak to changing times.

References

Further reading 
 John, Suki (2012). Contemporary Dance in Cuba: Tecnica Cubana as Revolutionary Movement. McFarland.

Contemporary dance
Cuba